Abbotts Ann Down is a hamlet in Hampshire, England, within the civil parish of Abbotts Ann.

External links

Villages in Hampshire
Test Valley

https://www.abbottsann.com/